Gonostegia is a genus of flowering plants belonging to the family Urticaceae.

Its native range is Tropical and Subtropical Asia to Northern Australia.

Species:

Gonostegia parvifolia 
Gonostegia pentandra 
Gonostegia triandra

References

Urticaceae
Urticaceae genera